Tracy Arnold Pratt (born March 8, 1943) is an American-born Canadian former professional ice hockey defenseman who played in the National Hockey League. He is the son of Hockey Hall of Fame defenseman Babe Pratt.

Playing career
Born in New York City where his father, Babe Pratt, played for the Rangers, Tracy grew up in Vancouver, British Columbia. He played for the Oakland Seals, Pittsburgh Penguins, Buffalo Sabres, Vancouver Canucks, Colorado Rockies and the Toronto Maple Leafs.

Awards and accomplishments
Turnbull Cup MJHL championship (1963)
Played in NHL All-Star Game (1975)

Career statistics

Regular season and playoffs

External links

1943 births
Living people
American men's ice hockey defensemen
Brandon Wheat Kings players
Buffalo Sabres players
Canadian ice hockey defencemen
Colorado Rockies (NHL) players
Flin Flon Bombers players
Ice hockey players from New York (state)
Ice hockey people from Vancouver
National Hockey League All-Stars
Oakland Seals players
Pittsburgh Penguins players
Sportspeople from New York City
St. Paul Rangers players
Toronto Maple Leafs players
Vancouver Canucks players